Salvia breviconnectivata is an annual or biennial herb that is native to Yunnan province in China, found growing along roadsides at  elevation.

Notes

breviconnectivata
Flora of China